The Casper Star-Tribune is a newspaper published in Casper, Wyoming, with statewide influence and readership.

It is Wyoming's largest print newspaper, with a daily circulation of 23,760 and a Sunday circulation of 21,041. The Star-Tribune covers local and state news. Its website, Trib.com, includes articles from the print paper, online updates, video and other multimedia content.

In 2002, the newspaper was acquired by Lee Enterprises.

History 
The origins of the Casper Star-Tribune date to 1891, when the weekly Natrona Tribune began publishing under the ownership of 20 men organized as the Republican Publishing Co. In 1897, A.J. Mokler acquired the newspaper and changed its name to the Natrona County Tribune. Mokler sold the Tribune in 1914 to J.E. Hanway and Associates and two years later Hanway produced the first edition of the Casper Daily Tribune, which quickly grew to become the largest newspaper in Wyoming by circulation. The weekly Natrona County Tribune continued to publish through the 1920s, when it merged with other publications and eventually shut down.

In 1920, Hanway commissioned a standalone building for the newspapers, the "Tribune Building" in downtown Casper, which was used by the company until 1963. The renamed Tribune Company purchased the morning Casper Herald in 1925 and merged it with Daily Tribune, creating the Casper Tribune-Herald.

The Casper Morning Star was first published in 1949, with Allan Drey as the founding editor and publisher. The Tribune Company acquired the Morning Star in 1955. In 1961 both newspapers were sold to Wyoming Publishers Inc., which renamed the daily edition the Casper Tribune and created a new Sunday edition called the Casper Star-Tribune. Separate delivery of the Morning Star and Tribune ended in 1965, replaced by a single daily and Sunday paper, the Casper Star-Tribune.

Howard Publications bought the paper in 1972 and operated the Star-Tribune until its acquisition by Lee Enterprises in 2002. Lee Enterprises purchased the Star-Tribune, along with family-owned Howard Publications' 15 other daily newspapers for $694 million.

In 1985, the Casper Star-Tribune was the runner-up for the Pulitzer Prize in excellence in public service journalism for its investigation of Northern Utilities Inc. The investigation found that the company was significantly overcharging natural gas customers in Wyoming due to an unfavorable agreement that Northern Utilities had entered into years earlier with its corporate parent.

The Casper Star-Tribune began charging for access to its website in 2011 by using a metered paywall.

In 2018, the newsroom staff of the Casper Star-Tribune voted to unionize under the umbrella of The News Guild, becoming the first newspaper staff in Wyoming to do so. The Casper Star-Tribune is the first newspaper owned by Lee Enterprises to have unionized while owned by the company.

The Casper Journal 
In 2004, the Casper Star-Tribune acquired The Casper Journal, a weekly news publication. In 2017 the Casper Journal's website was transferred to the Casper Star-Tribune's website. The Casper Journal printed its last edition in August 2022.

Reputation 
The Casper Star-Tribune regularly wins the Wyoming Press Association's "Deming Cup for General Excellence", awarded to the best large newspaper in the state, as well as other regional awards.

The Casper Star-Tribune's editorial board has endorsed both Republicans and Democrats for public office. In 2008, the newspaper endorsed Democratic nominee Barack Obama. In 2012, the editorial board endorsed Republican nominee Mitt Romney. The newspaper did not endorse a presidential candidate in 2016.

References

External links
 
 

Daily newspapers published in the United States
Newspapers published in Wyoming
Organizations based in Casper, Wyoming
Lee Enterprises publications
Publications established in 1891
1891 establishments in Wyoming